Probable G-protein coupled receptor 174 is a protein that in humans is encoded by the GPR174 gene.

References

Further reading

G protein-coupled receptors